Vera West (28 June 1898 – 29 June 1947) was an American fashion designer and film costume designer. From 1928 to 1947, she was the chief costume designer for Universal Pictures.

Life
The details of West's early life are unclear. According to the 1910 census she was 12 year old which makes her birthdate as 28 June 1898,  and her birthplace is given as Philadelphia. Her parents were Emer L (of Maryland) and mother was Clara N. Of Philadelphia. She had a younger sister Hazel. She attended the Philadelphia School of Design for Women. After graduation, West designed dresses for a high-end fashion salon on Fifth Avenue in New York. In the mid-1920s, she was forced to leave New York for unknown personal reasons. She eventually went to Hollywood, where she found a job with Universal Pictures and rose to become chief costume designer for the film studio in 1928.

The first production for which she made costumes based on her own designs was the film The Man Who Laughs (1928) by German director Paul Leni, based on the Victor Hugo novel of the same name. According to IMDb, West has at least 393 film credits. She specialised in gowns, and was not only responsible for dressing the actors, but also saw to their off-film personal styling.

One of West's best-known designs is the gown worn by Ava Gardner in the 1946 film The Killers.

In early 1947, West left Universal to work on a spring fashion collection for a salon in the Beverly Wilshire Hotel.

Vera West was married twice, first to Stephen D. Kille in 1924, and by 1930 to businessman Jack/Jacques C. West. On 29 June 1947, she was found dead in the swimming pool of her Los Angeles home. Based on two notes she had left that suggested that she had been blackmailed for years, the police assumed she committed suicide by drowning. The exact circumstances of her death were never fully established. West is buried in the Western Great Mausoleum at Forest Lawn Memorial Park in Glendale.

Legacy
West is considered one of the early female pioneers of costume design in the Hollywood industry, in that she was one of the first women to be a studio's chief designer.

West was inducted in to the Costume Designers Guild Hall of Fame in 2005.

A rare survival of West's early work is a costumed mannequin of Frankenstein's Monster from the 1935 movie Bride of Frankenstein. This was featured in the BBC1 programme Secrets of the Museum in March 2020, where it was being treated by the Victoria & Albert Museum's conservators.

See also
List of unsolved deaths

Filmography (selection)
1928: The Man Who Laughs
1932: The Mummy 
1935: Bride of Frankenstein
1935: Diamond Jim 
1935: Remember Last Night?
1935: Magnificent Obsession
1936: Next Time We Love
1936: The Magnificent Brute
1938: Mad About Music
1938: The Rage of Paris
1938: That Certain Age
1939: Son of Frankenstein
1939: You Can't Cheat an Honest Man
1939: First Love
1939: Tower of London
1939: Destry Rides Again
1940: The Invisible Man Returns
1940: My Little Chickadee
1940: Black Friday
1940: When the Daltons Rode
1940: Spring Parade
1940: The Bank Dick
1940: The Invisible Woman
1940: The House of the Seven Gables
1941: This Woman Is Mine
1941: Hold That Ghost
1941: It Started with Eve
1941: Never Give a Sucker an Even Break
1941: Appointment for Love
1941: The Wolf Man
1941: Hellzapoppin'
1942: The Ghost of Frankenstein
1942: The Spoilers
1942: Invisible Agent
1942: Pardon My Sarong
1942: Sherlock Holmes and the Voice of Terror
1942: Sherlock Holmes and the Secret Weapon
1942: Arabian Nights
1943: Shadow of a Doubt
1943: The Amazing Mrs. Holliday
1943: Frankenstein Meets the Wolf Man
1943: Sherlock Holmes in Washington
1943: Hers to Hold
1943: Phantom of the Opera
1943: Sherlock Holmes Faces Death
1943: Flesh and Fantasy
1943: Son of Dracula
1943: His Butler's Sister
1943: Sherlock Holmes and the Spider Woman
1944: Ali Baba and the Forty Thieves
1944: Phantom Lady
1944: Follow the Boys
1944: Cobra Woman
1944: Christmas Holiday
1944: The Pearl of Death
1944: The Merry Monahans
1944: The House of Frankenstein
1944: The Suspect
1945: The Woman in Green
1945: Pursuit to Algiers
1945: This Love of Ours
1946: Terror by Night
1946: She-Wolf of London
1946: Dressed to Kill
1946: Black Angel
1946: Magnificent Doll
1947: Pirates of Monterey

References

External links 
Blog with photos of West's designs
Sketch by West of a gown featured in The Phantom of the Opera

Vera West feature by Whidbey Island Film Festival
Vera West's Frankenstein's Monster dressed mannequin in the Victoria & Albert Museum
West on Find a Grave

1947 deaths
1947 suicides
19th-century births
American costume designers
American fashion designers
American women fashion designers
Burials at Forest Lawn Memorial Park (Glendale)
NBCUniversal people
Suicides by drowning in the United States
Universal Pictures
Unsolved deaths in the United States
Women costume designers
Year of birth uncertain